George Blackall Simonds (6 October 1843 – 16 December 1929) was an English sculptor and director of H & G Simonds Brewery in Reading in the English county of Berkshire.

Biography
George was the second son of George Simonds Senior of Reading, director of H & G Simonds, and Mary Anne, the daughter of William Boulger of Bradfield. His grandfather was Reading brewing and banking entrepreneur, William Blackall Simonds. He added Blackall to his name after the death of his brother, Blackall Simonds II, in 1905. He was brother-in-law of the portrait painter, John Collingham Moore, and cousin of the botanist, George Simonds Boulger. He served as the inaugural Master of the Art Workers' Guild in 1884-85.

His best known works are The Falconer (1873) in Central Park, New York City (US) and the Maiwand Lion (1886) in the Forbury Gardens, Reading in Berkshire (UK).

In 1922, he temporarily came out of retirement to build the war memorial in Bradfield, the village where he lived in Berkshire. This commemorates the deaths of local men in the First World War, including his son, a lieutenant in the 2nd Battalion, South Wales Borderers.

In 2005, users of Reading Borough Libraries, voted him winner of the 'Great People of Reading' poll.

Works

Notes

References

External links

New York City Department of Parks and Recreation: The Falconer
Reading Borough Libraries: George Blackall Simonds 
Royal Berkshire History: George Blackall Simonds

1843 births
1929 deaths
19th-century British sculptors
20th-century British sculptors
19th-century English male artists
20th-century English male artists
Artists from Reading, Berkshire
English brewers
English businesspeople
English male sculptors
Masters of the Art Worker's Guild
People educated at Bradfield College
People from Bradfield, Berkshire
People from Westminster